The following lists events that happened during 2015 in the Republic of South Sudan.

Incumbents 

 President: Salva Kiir Mayardit
 Vice President: James Wani Igga

Events

June

 June 23 - A cholera outbreak is declared after 171 people are infected while 18 people die from it.

July

 July 3 - 29 people are revealed to have died from a cholera outbreak.

 July 9 - The first coins of the South Sudanese pound were released into circulation. They are 10, 20, and 50 Piasters

References

 
2010s in South Sudan
South Sudan
South Sudan
Years of the 21st century in South Sudan